In mathematics, in the theory of discrete groups, superrigidity is a concept designed to show how a linear representation ρ of a discrete group Γ inside an algebraic group G can, under some circumstances, be as good as a representation of G itself. That this phenomenon happens for certain broadly defined classes of lattices inside semisimple groups was the discovery of Grigory Margulis, who proved some fundamental results in this direction.

There is more than one result that goes by the name of Margulis superrigidity. One simplified statement is this: take G to be a simply connected semisimple real algebraic group in GLn, such that the Lie group of its real points has real rank at least 2 and no compact factors. Suppose Γ is an irreducible lattice in G. For a local field F and ρ a linear representation of the lattice Γ of the Lie group, into GLn (F), assume the image ρ(Γ) is not relatively compact (in the topology arising from F) and such that its closure in the Zariski topology is connected. Then F is the real numbers or the complex numbers, and there is a rational representation of G giving rise to ρ by restriction.

See also
Mostow rigidity theorem
Local rigidity

Notes

References

 Gromov, M.; Pansu, P. Rigidity of lattices: an introduction. Geometric topology: recent developments (Montecatini Terme, 1990), 39–137, Lecture Notes in Math., 1504, Springer, Berlin, 1991. doi:10.1007/BFb0094289
 Gromov, Mikhail; Schoen, Richard. Harmonic maps into singular spaces and p-adic superrigidity for lattices in groups of rank one. Inst. Hautes Études Sci. Publ. Math. No. 76 (1992), 165–246. 
 Ji, Lizhen. A summary of the work of Gregory Margulis. Pure Appl. Math. Q. 4 (2008), no. 1, Special Issue: In honor of Grigory Margulis. Part 2, 1–69. [Pages 17-19]
 Jost, Jürgen; Yau, Shing-Tung. Applications of quasilinear PDE to algebraic geometry and arithmetic lattices. Algebraic geometry and related topics (Inchon, 1992), 169–193, Conf. Proc. Lecture Notes Algebraic Geom., I, Int. Press, Cambridge, MA, 1993.
 
Tits, Jacques. Travaux de Margulis sur les sous-groupes discrets de groupes de Lie. Séminaire Bourbaki, 28ème année (1975/76), Exp. No. 482, pp. 174–190. Lecture Notes in Math., Vol. 567, Springer, Berlin, 1977.

Discrete groups